Cancienes is one of seven parishes (administrative divisions) in the Corvera de Asturias municipality, within the province and autonomous community of Asturias, in northern Spain.

The population is 1,651 (INE 2007).

Villages
Aguilero (Guilero)
Bango
Barredo (Barreo)
Camina
Campo la Vega (El Campu la Vega)
Cancienes
El Acebo (L'Acebo)
El Cabañón
El Monte
El Portazgo (El Portalgo)
Fuentecaliente (Fontecaliente)
La Cabaña (La Cabaña)
La Pedrera
La Pescal
La Picosa
La Rebollada (La Rebollada)
Menudera (La Menudera)
Mora
Moriana
Núñez (Nuña)

References 

Parishes in Corvera de Asturias